Schvendes are a band of brothers and sisters from Perth, Western Australia. They write stories about murder, mayhem, love and loss upon a background of gentle Rhodes piano, pounding drums, screaming guitar, soaring cello and vocals, which have been described as both sweet and terrifying. With an emphasis on lyrics depicting small disasters and celebration of everyday existence, their music is a blend of country, dirty blues and rock.  Their influences include Nick Cave and the Bad Seeds, Dirty Three, PJ Harvey, Ennio Morricone, Tom Waits and Nina Simone.

History
Schvendes were originally known as The Schvendes Ensemble, a gothy musical wing of the 2002 Artrage Festival, where they performed under the auspices of performance art within art festivals. In this mode they recorded their first release, the hand-packaged live album, The Scoundrel is Made an Outcast, which was released in October 2002. Over the next couple of years the group morphed into a more conventional music group playing at various popular Perth venues.

In March 2005 the group released their debut EP, Turn Out Your Lights, produced by Ben Franz (The Waifs), which was released nationally in December 2005 on Reverberation. This was followed by the release of the single, "Small Mercies, Sweet Graves" in December and a second EP, Twice the Man in March 2006; which was also produced by Franz.

In 2008 the band signed with local independent label, Good Cop Bad Cop and released their debut album, Sweet Talk Your Enemies, on 28 June 2008, distributed nationally through Inertia.

Tours
In the last year, the band played some seventy shows including the Perth International Arts Festival and WAMi shows as well as a number of national supports for artists such The Kill Devil Hills, Dirty Three, Augie March, Art of Fighting, the Drones, Ed Kuepper, Tim Rogers and Tex Perkins, The Go Betweens, Kim Salmon, Decoder Ring, Tucker B's, 67 Special, Youth Group, The Devoted Few, Holly Throsby and New Buffalo.

In 2007 the band played at the Perth leg of the Big Day Out and in March performed in Toronto at the Canadian Music Week, followed by a number of shows in New York, including a support for Love of Diagrams.

In 2008 the band toured nationally in support of the release of their debut album.

Members
 Rachael Dease – vocals, bass
 Tristen Parr – cello
 Matt Maguire – drums
 Tara John – rhodes piano
 Ant Gray – guitar

Discography

Studio albums

Live albums

Extended plays

Awards and nominations

WAM Song of the Year
The WAM Song of the Year was formed by the  Western Australian Rock Music Industry Association Inc. (WARMIA) in 1985, with its main aim to develop and run annual awards recognising achievements within the music industry in Western Australia.
 
 (wins only)
|-
| 2007
| "Bring Out Your Dead" 
| Mixed Bag Song of the Year
| 
|-
| 2010
| "Lay the Noose" 
| Pop Song of the Year
| 
|-

West Australian Music Industry Awards
The West Australian Music Industry Awards (WAMIs) are annual awards presented to the local contemporary music industry, put on annually by the Western Australian Music Industry Association Inc (WAM).
 
 (wins only)
|-
| rowspan="3"| 2006
| "Turn out your Lights"
| Most Popular Single/EP
| 
|-
| Schvendes
| Most Promising New Act
| 
|-
| Tristen Parr (Schvendes)
| Best Instrumentalist
| 
|-
| 2007
| Tristen Parr (Schvendes)
| Best Instrumentalist
| 
|-
| rowspan="2"| 2008
| Ant Gray (Schvendes)
| Best Guitarist
| 
|-
| Tristen Parr (Schvendes)
| Best Instrumentalist
| 
|-

References

External links

 Schvendes Official Site
 Schvendes Myspace Site
 AMO Site
 Schvendes discography at MusicBrainz

Australian rock music groups
Western Australian musical groups
Musical groups established in 2002
2002 establishments in Australia